Out of the Storm is the fourth studio album by Scottish musician Jack Bruce. It was Bruce's first solo effort in over three years and was recorded and released in 1974, following the dissolution of the power trio West, Bruce and Laing.  Originally Bruce had wanted to title the album Into The Storm but, according to Bruce, "we couldn't find any stormy weather. We gave up and instead we found a little wood".

The album was largely recorded in Los Angeles and San Francisco at the suggestion of engineer Andy Johns, who felt, according to Bruce, that the problem with Bruce's previous work was that he "work(ed) with too many British guys and you need to work with some great American session players and you could make an album in ten days".

Bruce recorded the album while still addicted to heroin (which contributed to the dissolution of West, Bruce and Laing). According to Bruce's songwriting partner Pete Brown, the band ingested PCP during one session and "they were all holding onto each other walking across the floor--Bobby Keys, Jim Keltner, Andy Johns and Jack. Someone said, 'Don't let go of me or I'll float off into space'". The continued and heavy drug use periodically interfered with completion of the album and engineer Dennis Weinreich was brought in to remix specific tracks so as to complete the album in a timely fashion and because the label wasn't pleased with Johns' mix of the album.

The album peaked at No. 160 on the Billboard album chart in December 1974. Critically well received, including a glowing review by Melody Maker's Allan Jones, who stated that Bruce was "one of the most important individuals currently working in rock", the album sold poorly.

Out of the Storm was the last Jack Bruce album distributed in the United States by Atlantic Records, as Bruce's company RSO Records, which was affiliated in the rest of the world with Polydor/Polygram, would shift U.S. distribution to Polydor beginning in 1976.

Cover
Bruce and a photographer traveled throughout the countryside looking for a storm to photograph for the original title Into The Storm. They were unable to find one so Bruce changed the title and elected to take a photo in the woods using whatever he found, which included an old, rusty bike. Bruce is visible in the background sitting partially in the dark with the landscape and the bike more prominent than Bruce himself is in the photo. Author Harry Shapiro in his book on Bruce suggested that the photo represented Bruce's state of mind at the time, wanting to disappear into the background and avoid all of the difficulties he was then facing.

2003 and 2011 reissues
The reissue of the album in 2003 (put out again by Esoteric Records in 2011) included a handful of the original mixes prepared for the album. In contrast to the finished album, the early mixes sound muddy and lack the studio polish that was added to the final version of the album. The reissue includes full liner notes on the recording and production of the album, but mistakenly credits "Pieces of Mind" as "Peaces of Mind".

Track listing 

All lyrics written by Pete Brown, music by Jack Bruce, except track 3 – music co-authored by Janet Godfrey.
"Pieces of Mind" – 5:39
"Golden Days" – 5:14
"Running Through Our Hands" – 4:14
"Keep on Wondering" – 3:10
"Keep It Down" – 3:46
"Into the Storm" – 4:45
"One" – 5:03
"Timeslip" – 6:33

2003 CD bonus tracks
<li>"Pieces of Mind" (First Mix)
<li>"Keep on Wondering" (First Mix)
<li>"Keep It Down" (First Mix)
<li>"Into the Storm" (First Mix)
<li>"One" (First Mix)

Personnel 
Performance
Jack Bruce – vocals, bass guitar, keyboards, harmonica
Steve Hunter – electric & acoustic guitars
Jim Keltner – drums (tracks: 2–6, 10–12)
Jim Gordon – drums (tracks: 1, 7–9, 13)
Production
Jack Bruce – producer, arranger
Andy Johns – engineer, producer
Austin – engineer
Dennis Weinreich – remix engineer

Recorded at Record Plants in Los Angeles and San Francisco.
Mixed at Record Plants in Los Angeles and San Francisco and at Olympic and Scorpio Studios in London.

References 

1974 albums
Jack Bruce albums
Albums produced by Andy Johns
Albums produced by Jack Bruce
RSO Records albums